This is a list of rivers in the Kerguelen Islands, a group of subantarctic islands belonging to France in the southern Indian Ocean.

References 

Landforms of the Kerguelen Islands
Rivers, Kerguelen Islands
Lakes in the Kerguelen Islands
Kerguelen